Tityos or Tityus (Ancient Greek: Τιτυός) was a giant from Greek mythology.

Family
Tityos was the son of Elara; his father was Zeus. He had a daughter named Europa who coupled with Poseidon and gave birth to Euphemus, one of the Argonauts.

Mythology 
Zeus hid Elara from his wife, Hera, by placing her deep beneath the earth. Tityos grew so large that he split his mother's womb, and he was carried to term by Gaia, the Earth. Once grown, Tityos attempted to rape Leto at the behest of Hera. He was slain by Leto's protective children Artemis and Apollo. In some accounts, Tityus was instead slain by the thunderbolt of his father Zeus. As punishment, he was stretched out in Tartarus and tortured by two vultures who fed on his liver, which grew back every night. This punishment is comparable to that of the Titan Prometheus.

Jane Ellen Harrison noted that, "To the orthodox worshiper of the Olympians he was the vilest of criminals; as such Homer knew him":

In the early first century, when the geographer Strabo visited Panopeus, he was reminded by the local people that it was the abode of Tityos and recalled the fact that the Phaeacians had carried Rhadamanthys in their boats to visit Tityos, according to Homer. There on Euboea at the time of Strabo they were still showing a "cave called Elarion from Elara who was mother to Tityos, and a hero-shrine of Tityos, and some kind of honours are mentioned which are paid him." It is clear that the local hero-cult had been superseded by the cult of the Olympian gods, an Olympian father provided, and the hero demonized. A comparable giant chthonic pre-Olympian of a Titan-like order is Orion.

The poet Lucretius restyles the figure of Tityos in book III (lines 978–998) of De rerum natura, a demythologized Tityos who is not in the underworld, eternally punished, but here and now, "the prototypical anguished lover", plagued by winged creatures that are not vultures, as E. J. Kenney argues but cupids. Virgil responds to Lucretius with a retrospective simile of Tityos in the Aeneid (6.595ff), which compares his torment of desire with the unrest of Dido, whose flame of love is eating her marrow.

The traveler Pausanias (2nd century A.D.) reports seeing a painting by Polygnotus at Delphi that depicts Tityos among other figures being tormented in Hades for sacrilege: "Tityos too is in the picture; he is no longer being punished, but has been reduced to nothing by continuous torture, an indistinct and mutilated phantom."

Popular culture
 Tityos is referenced in Dante Alighieri's Inferno. He is mentioned to be among the biblical and mythological giants that are frozen onto the rings outside of Hell's Circle of Treachery. Dante and Virgil threatened to go to Tityos and Typhon if Antaeus doesn't lower them into the Circle of Treachery.
 The Tomb of Tityos is a location in Assassin's Creed Odyssey that features a very large broken statue of Tityos being eaten by vultures.

Citations

General and cited references 
 Brill’s New Pauly: Encyclopaedia of the Ancient World. Antiquity, Volume 14, Sym–Tub, editors: Hubert Cancik, Helmuth Schneider, Brill, 2009. . Online version at Brill.
 Harrison, Jane Ellen. Prolegomena to the Study of Greek Religion. (1903), 1922, p. 336f.
 Hard, Robin, The Routledge Handbook of Greek Mythology: Based on H. J. Rose's "Handbook of Greek Mythology", Psychology Press, 2004. . Google Books.
 Homer, The Odyssey with an English Translation by A. T. Murray, PH.D. in two volumes. Cambridge, MA., Harvard University Press; London, William Heinemann, Ltd. 1919. . Online version at the Perseus Digital Library. Greek text available from the same website.
 Hyginus, Gaius Julius, Fabulae from The Myths of Hyginus translated and edited by Mary Grant. University of Kansas Publications in Humanistic Studies. Online version at the Topos Text Project.
 Pausanias, Description of Greece with an English Translation by W. H. S. Jones, Litt.D., and H. A. Ormerod, M.A., in 4 Volumes. Cambridge, MA, Harvard University Press; London, William Heinemann Ltd. 1918. . Online version at the Perseus Digital Library.
 Pausanias, Graeciae Descriptio. 3 vols. Leipzig, Teubner. 1903.  Greek text available at the Perseus Digital Library.
 Smith, William. Dictionary of Greek and Roman Biography and Mythology, London (1873). "Ti'tyus" .

External links

 Tityos engraved by N. Beatrizet from the De Verda collection

Characters in Book VI of the Aeneid
Children of Zeus
Condemned souls in Tartarus
Deeds of Apollo
Deeds of Artemis
Deeds of Hera
Deeds of Zeus
Demigods in classical mythology
Greek giants
Leto